DWCM (99.5 FM), broadcasting as  99.5 Love Radio, is a radio station owned and operated by Manila Broadcasting Company through its licensee Pacific Broadcasting System. Its studio and transmitter are located at the 3rd Floor Morante Bldg., Rizal St., Imperial Court Subd. Phase 2, Legazpi, Albay. This station operates daily from 4:00 AM to midnight.

References

Pacific Broadcasting Systems stations
Radio stations in Legazpi, Albay
Radio stations established in 1989
Love Radio Network stations